Lujiazui is a station on Line 2 and 14 of the Shanghai Metro rapid transit system, situated in the middle of the financial district of Lujiazui. The station later became an interchange on 30 December 2021 after the opening of Line 14. Being at the centre of Lujiazui, the station is of significance to the area.

Location
Lujiazui station is located in the financial district of the same name near the eastern bank of the Huangpu River. Located at the major intersection of Century Avenue, Fenghe Road, Lujiazui West Road, and Lujiazui Ring Road, the station is within reach of many famous attractions in Shanghai. To the northwest is the Oriental Pearl Tower, Shanghai IFC lies to the immediate south, and Super Brand Mall lies to the southwest. Further afield, the Jin Mao Tower and Shanghai World Financial Center lie to the southeast, the latter of which is equidistant between Lujiazui and  stations. A number of parks, including Lujiazui Central Green, are within a few minutes' walk from the station as well.

Station Layout

Gallery

References

Shanghai Metro stations in Pudong
Railway stations in China opened in 1999
Line 2, Shanghai Metro
Railway stations in Shanghai
Line 14, Shanghai Metro